Otter Press is an Australian comic book publishing company, which releases the American Simpsons Comics series in Australia. Otter began publishing in 1998 with Simpsons Comics #32, and have published hundreds of different Simpsons books since then, spanning over ten series. They have also published various anime, movie, and other graphic novels.

History
Simpsons Comics were initially published in Australia by Trielle Corporation (Trielle Komix), between 1993 and 1997. In 1998 Trielle went into liquidation at which time Rik Booth and Ross Alexander approached Bongo Comics, the American producers of Simpson Comics and secured the Australasian publishing rights to the comics. Booth had previously worked as a consultant to Marvel Comics in the Australasian market. They then established Otter Press, with their first issue of Simpsons Comics (Issue No. 32) being released in 1998.

The comics were originally printed bi-monthly, but due to popular demand, earlier issues were released every month that a "new" edition was unavailable. Issues #15 to #31 were released between 1999 and 2001 in four American trade paperback editions.

The Bart Simpson comics series, for the first 15 issues, was padded out to 64 pages with a free Radioactive Man issue inside. Later editions dropped Radioactive Man, and combined two US comics into one release. In 2008, Otter Press began releasing Bart Simpson comics every two months as opposed to their old quarterly schedule. Recent editions now alternate between reprinting two US editions of the comic in a single issue, with the next issue containing one US edition and older stories taken from the One Shot Wonders series.

Otter Press also published titles featuring Looney Tunes characters, Scooby-Doo, and SpongeBob SquarePants. They have also issued one-shot comic book movie adaptations (including Batman Begins, X-Men: The Last Stand) as well as magazines based on popular toy lines, such as Action Man Magazine.Currently their page is shut down as well as their comics which they stopped making a couple years back. So there is no longer new issues of any of their series of comics as of 2018.

Comics titles published 
 Futurama Comics  
 High School Musical The Official Magazine 2009-
 Jimmy Neutron Digest
 Looney Tunes Activity Special  2009-
 Looney Tunes All-Star  2008
 Looney Tunes Comic Capers! Magazine  2009-
 Looney Tunes Magazine 2008
 Scooby-Doo Magazine  2008-
 Simpsons Comics  1998-
 SpongeBob SquarePants The Official Magazine  2007-
 Shrek 2004
 Tom and Jerry Activity Special
 Walt Disney Comics Digest
 Walt Disney's Mickey Mouse Digest
 Walt Disney's Uncle Scrooge Digest
 Batman: The Brave and the Bold SuperMag 2012-''

See also
Best Of The Simpsons
Bongo Comics Group

References

External links

1998 establishments in Australia
Publishing companies established in 1998
Comic book publishing companies of Australia